The Philadelphia Wings are a lacrosse team based in Philadelphia, Pennsylvania playing in the National Lacrosse League (NLL). The 2023 season is their 4th season in the NLL.

Regular season

Final standings

Game log

Roster

Entry draft
The 2022 NLL Entry Draft took place on September 10, 2022. The Wings made the following selections:

References

Philadelphia
Philadelphia Wings seasons
Philadelphia Wings